The Split is a 1968 American neo-noir crime drama film directed by Gordon Flemyng and written by Robert Sabaroff based upon the Parker novel The Seventh by Richard Stark (a pseudonym of Donald E. Westlake).

The film stars Jim Brown, along with Diahann Carroll, Julie Harris, Ernest Borgnine, Jack Klugman, Warren Oates, Donald Sutherland and Gene Hackman. The music is by Quincy Jones. It is notable for being the first film with an R rating.

Plot
Thieves fall out when more than a half-million dollars goes missing after the daring and carefully planned robbery of the Los Angeles Coliseum during a football game, each one accusing the other of having the money.

The heist has been masterminded by a man named McClain and his partner, Gladys. In choosing their accomplices carefully, McClain challenges getaway driver Harry Kifka to a race, picks a fight with thug Bert Clinger, imprisons electrical expert Marty Gough in a wire-controlled vault to watch him fashion an escape, and has a shooting match with marksman Dave Negli before pulling off the job.

Together, the thieves make off with over $500,000. With the five men having carried out the heist and Gladys having financed it, the plan is to split the money six ways the next day.  McClain stashes the money for the night with Ellie, his ex-wife. While his partners impatiently await their split of the loot, Lt. Walter Brill takes charge of the case. Ellie is attacked and killed by Herb Sutro, her landlord, who also steals the money'

The rest of the gang members hold McClain accountable for the lost money and demand that he retrieve it.  Brill quickly solves the murder and is well aware of the connection to the robber.  He kills Sutro, but keeps the money for himself.  With Ellie's murderer identified, but still no trace of the money, the gang members all turn on McClain, assuming he's hiding it.  This leads to a confrontation that ends with the deaths of Negli and Gladys.

McClain escapes and visits Brill, threatening to reveal that Brill has the money.  He and Brill decide to divide it up between themselves, but the rest of McClain's gang has other ideas.  After a shoot-out at the docks, only McClain and Brill are left—Brill decides to take a small part of the money, giving McClain his rightful sixth, and plans to return the rest to win a promotion.  McClain is satisfied with the arrangement, but also haunted by Ellie's death. With his money, he is about to board a flight leaving town when he hears an off-screen female's voice call his name.

Cast
 Jim Brown as McClain
 Diahann Carroll as Ellie Kennedy
 Ernest Borgnine as Bert Clinger
 Julie Harris as Gladys
 Gene Hackman as Lieutenant Walter Brill
 Jack Klugman as Harry Kifka
 Warren Oates as Marty Gough
 James Whitmore as Herb Sutro
 Donald Sutherland as Dave Negli
 Joyce Jameson as Jenifer
 Harry Hickox as Detective
 Jackie Joseph as Jackie
 Warren Vanders as Mason

Production
The film was produced by Irwin Winkler and Robert Chartoff who had just made another movie based on a "Parker" novel for MGM, Point Blank. Winkler offered the lead part to Steve McQueen who originally wanted to do it, but then decided to make Bullitt instead. Jim Brown had read the script and was enthusiastic about it and he was cast instead. MGM had made several movies with Brown and agreed to finance.

"This negro is no Harvard graduate on his way to winning a Nobel prize," said Chartoff of the lead character. "He doesn't hit a white man just because he had been hit by him first."

Jim Brown was under a long-term contract to MGM at the time. He was paid $125,000 for the role.

Chartoff and Winkler had success in using a British director, John Boorman, on Point Blank, so sought out another one for The Split. They chose Gordon Flemyng, who had impressed them with his work on Great Catherine. A strong support cast was selected to give Brown as much support as possible.

The film was originally called Run the Man Down.

Jim Brown's original action double for the movie was  pioneering stuntman Calvin Brown, the first black stunt performer in Hollywood. (Prior to the 1960s, on the rare occasions that a stunt double was required for a black actor, they were typically doubled by a white stunt performer in blackface).

Reception
Winkler called the film "a solid thriller, no more, no less. Nothing to be ashamed of, nothing to be proud of, except the accidental casting that was groundbreaking." The movie was previewed at Oakland in order to ensure a sizable African American audience, but the movie was not particularly well received. Winkler wrote "the film just wasn't good enough to capture an audience."

See also
List of American films of 1968
Heist film
List of hood films

References

External links

The Split at TCMDB

1968 films
1968 crime drama films
American crime drama films
Films scored by Quincy Jones
Films based on American novels
Films based on works by Donald E. Westlake
Films directed by Gordon Flemyng
Films set in Los Angeles
American heist films
Metro-Goldwyn-Mayer films
Films produced by Robert Chartoff
American neo-noir films
1960s heist films
1960s English-language films
1960s American films